Nueng Nai Suang is a Thai television drama series starring Jirayu Tangsrisuk and Urassaya Sperbund. It aired on Channel 3 from May 28 to July 8, 2015.

Synopsis 
News of the journey back from France after the graduation of master's diplomatic of Anawat Patcharapojanat (or Nueng), is the son of a former diplomat, Vit Patcharapojanat. The news received much attention from girls, especially from Sisuk and Hattentioner named Songsang. But for Hatairat Ratchapitak, whose parents are dead and she has been taken cared of by Sut and Thip Duenpradap, as if she was their own daughter. She did not feel excited unlike the other girls and has also expressed that she did not like guys who were arrogant. When Anawat returned to Thailand, he came to visit his relatives and Sisuk’s and Duenpradap’s family too. But he had missed Hatairat every time. Anawat visits Pinij Panatpong, who is an old friend of his, but do not meet in the end. Pinij then recuperated at the ranch of his brother, is Pinai. Because regrets about his lover named Hatairat.

The next day, Anawat goes to Duenpradap's house and he meets with Sattha, Suda and Hatairat. As soon as he met Anawat's bias against Hatairat immediately. Anawat is frustrated that Hathairat is intentionally ignoring him. He feels that he is being dishonored. He vows to make her pay for this. Later, Sattha and Suda prepared a birthday party for Sut at Duenpradap's house, for Anawat to be reconciled with Hatairat. They are inviting relatives and friends to attend more usually.

During Sut’s birthday party, Songsang took the opportunity to dance with Anawat and Hatairat there are many young men come to dance, too. Which he and she are also keep an eye on each other. But finally ends the pompous put together. Although Anawat to say that he doesn't love Hatairat and also hate her. But Anawat also by the squabbling to disruptive Hatairat almost every day. Khun Chai moves to the States for a while, Hatairat has to go and teach at Anawat’s house.

Not for a long time. Dr. Prasong told the news that will marry Ura but Anawat mistook the bride is Hatairat. He was disappointed after hearing the news and he was surprised that she did not feel anything. When he knew Hatairat is only a bridesmaid. Anawat was very angry and she left him not understand anything.

He is caressing Hatairat when he took her home. Hatairat felt very angry but Anawat felt satisfied that he can overcome her. Pinij unwillingly marries Jampee but he is obliged to do so because told by his mother. Before the wedding date, Pinij was seriously ill, and wanted to see Hatairat one last time. Anawat invited Hatairat to meet Pinij, but Pinij was sent to Bangkok. As Anawat was driving back, the car broke down which resulted in him to stay overnight at the ranch with Hatairat. When they return to Bangkok, they get scolded by Vit and Sut because they stayed together. Therefore, Anawat was told to be engaged with Hatairat to show some responsibility. Because Hatairat wants to overcome and Sisuk Songsang she decided to engage with Anawat.

Later Anawat decided to confess to Hatairat, and asked her to marry him. But, she denied him, thus making him regret the confession. Later, Vit received news that Anawat had been in a car accident in Chiang Mai. Hatairat was shocked and travelled by plane to meet him immediately. When the two met again, they declared their love for each other. Hatairat confirmed that she will love and take care of Anawat forever and they got happily married.

Cast 
 Jirayu Tangsrisuk as Nueng/Anawat
 Urassaya Sperbund as Hatairach/Poom
 Fair Gundon Akhazzan as Pu
 Poly Pattrakorn Tungsupakul as Sattha Panee
 Nam Ronadech Wongsaroj as Khun Chai
 Michelle Behrmann as Paen
 Chotika Wongwilas as Songsaeng
 Ohm Kanin Stanley as Pinit
 Namnung Suttidachanai ad Chulee
 Ball Jitpanu as Khun Mor Prasong
 Daraneenuch Pohpiti as Mae Nom
 Mick Boromwuti Hiranyatihi as Khun Rewy

References

External links

 Facebook The Official

Thai television soap operas
Thai romance television series
2015 Thai television series debuts
2015 Thai television series endings
Channel 3 (Thailand) original programming